= Nicks Spring =

Coordinates: 42°00′13″N 122°59′21″W

Nicks Spring is a spring in the U.S. state of Oregon.

Nicks Spring was named in the 1870s after Nicholas Wright, a local miner.
